is a Japanese anime television series conceived and directed by Akitaro Daichi, with a screenplay by Hideyuki Kurata.  It premiered in Japan on the WOWOW television station on October 14, 1999 and ran until January 20, 2000. It was licensed for Region 1 DVD English language release by Central Park Media under their US Manga Corps label. Following the 2009 bankruptcy and liquidation of Central Park Media, ADV Films rescued the series for a boxset re-release on July 7, 2009. However, the ADV re-release is now out of print. The series is available for purchase through iTunes, YouTube and Google Play.

Now and Then, Here and There follows a young boy named Shuzo "Shu" Matsutani who, in an attempt to save an unknown girl, is transported to another world which may be the Earth in the far future. The world is desolate and militarized, survival is a daily struggle for displaced refugees, and water is a scarce commodity.

Plot
While walking home from school, "Shu", the main protagonist and a boy who loves kendo, intercedes to protect a girl, Lala-Ru, who is attacked by abductors piloting dragon-like mechas and is accidentally transported to the attackers' world as a result—a wasteland devoid of water and dominated by a red giant star. Lala-Ru possesses a pendant containing a vast reservoir of water, and she has the ability to control it.

Shu is trapped in this new, harsh reality, and he is beaten and interrogated repeatedly inside the warship commanded by the ruthless, manic dictator, Hamdo. While locked in a cell he meets an abducted girl who introduces herself as Sara Ringwalt of America. Sara's reason for her capture was being mistaken for Lala-Ru by Hamdo's minions. Sara is forced into the quarters of exceptional soldiers to be impregnated and is traumatized by her repeated rape. After an assault by an unknown enemy landship, Shu is forced to join an army of child soldiers; children trained for the looting of villages, in which they kidnap female villagers for breeding, and conscript orphaned male children into the ever dwindling ranks of Hamdo's army.

It is a haunting story of a dystopian world, and of Shu, who has to endure torture, hunger, and the horrors of war in order to save the lonely girl he found sitting atop a smokestack. Much of the series deals with serious moral issues relating to war and famine, the consequences of war, slavery, rape, and the exploitation of children.

Characters
  is a student of kendo and carries a shinai, though he fights primarily with a wooden stick, which also is a motif for his non-lethal combat style. After being thrust into a new world and brutally interrogated, he is forced to join the child army of Hellywood. Shu's character is strong-willed, uncompromising, obstinate, and believes that good can come from all situations. His devotion to protect Lala-Ru is one of the main aspects of the story. His experiences and interactions with Lala-Ru, Hamdo, and Nabuca open his eyes to the new world. Despite overwhelming odds, he retains his principles of not killing and of believing that good will still come while one is alive. After saving the world by convincing Lala-Ru that people are good, Shu is sent back home by a reformed Abelia. 
  possesses the power to manipulate water using a pendant containing a now nearly-depleted water reservoir, which is directly tied to her physical strength and health. She is quiet and non-violent (often failing to resist violence against her) and appears to be a child, although her age is unknown (she claims to be thousands of years old). Due to her long and disillusioned experience with humans, she feels little to no emotions with them. Her relationship with Shu changes her to be more protective and open with Shu and Sis; Shu for risking his life despite being in a foreign land as well as knowing nothing about her, and Sis for treating her like a daughter despite not knowing her very long. After using her power to flood Hellywood and parts of the world with water she soon vanished from existence right next to Shu after seeing the sunset for the last time. 
 , the military leader of a kingdom called Hellywood, he is a shrewd but has the mentality of a spoiled ten-year-old child, paranoid megalomaniac. He feels a sense of entitlement to water, an essential resource in his plans to rule the Earth, that leads to an obsession with the mysterious Lala-Ru and the suppression of any who stand in his way. Water is also required to launch his flying fortress, which is powered by water. In a quest to secure water and other resources needed for his ultimate goal, Hamdo's army abducts children and other villagers to use as human capital in his endeavor. Hamdo suffers from uncontrollable bursts of rage. In a gruesome display of his blind emotion, he kills a cat, only to throw it on the ground and step on it later while interrogating Shu. Later in the series, Hamdo's lust for water and power begets paranoia and he begins to doubt the loyalty of his adviser. He died at the end of the series when he drowned in the transport chamber (all the while suffering a complete mental breakdown, screaming and shrieking like a frightened child), his lifeless corpse dragged away by the current. 
  is the devoted commanding officer of Hamdo's army. She is a capable military strategist, though Hamdo does not always heed her advice. Abelia thanklessly yields to the whim of her senior. By the series' end, she'd given up on supporting Hamdo's ambitions and leaves him to die amidst the chaos of his eroding empire. She then joins the free world to establish a peaceful future alongside them. 
  is the leader of the child army unit Shu is forced to join. He resents Shu and sees him as a troublemaker. He feels ashamed for Shu having saved his life during a fight. Nabuca, just a child himself, devotes himself entirely to the army in the hopes that he will someday be allowed to return to his home. He repeatedly tells himself that what he does is the only thing that will enable him to return home, and this thought is the only thing keeping him going. Once Boo dies trying to protect him, he eventually comes to realize all too late the nature of his actions and has a sudden change of heart. In the last episode, he is betrayed and mortally wounded by Tabool, one of the boys in his unit and the only other survivor from their village. After painfully making his way to the jail cell where Shu is being kept with other prisoners from Zari-Bars, he tells Shu to go back to where he came from and that it is where he belongs. He dies immediately after in the arms of Shu who holds him through the prison cell bars. 
  is the youngest soldier in Nabuca's unit and his closest companion. He is naïve, and like Nabuca, believes he will be sent home after the war until then end where he loses hope of regaining a sense of normalcy and cannot go on. Boo dies during the invasion of Zari-Bars in episode 12 where he takes a bullet for Nabuca. 
  is an American girl who is mistaken for Lala-Ru and is kidnapped on her way to pick up her father from work. She is taken to Hellywood where she is regularly raped by the Hellywood soldiers, one of whom she murders in self-defense. After escaping from Hellywood, she is rescued from the desert sands by Sis who brings her to Zari-Bars. Sara resents Lala-Ru and blames her solely for the predicament she is in. Unable to cope with the pain of being raped and carrying a child as a result of her ordeal, she attempts to commit suicide and abort the baby by pounding a rock into her abdomen. Shu, however, intervenes, taking the blows of the rock on his hand which he uses to cover her abdomen. Sis' dying request that she not hate the faultless baby changes Sara's mind and she decides to stay in the desert world with her baby, Sis' orphans, and ex-Hellywood child soldiers to start a new life. 
  is a boy soldier in Nabuca's unit who came from the same village as Nabuca. He appears captivated with the actions of Hamdo and his war and is uninterested in returning home. He is attracted to the strength of the military, and bullies others in the unit. In the final episode, he shoots and mortally wounds Nabuca, and not long after, he dies while trying to survive Hellywood's destruction by Lala-Ru's flood, being drowned in the water and his lifeless body sucked away by the current. 
  is a tough and respected member of the city-state Zari-Bars. She acts as a caretaker and stand-in mother for the children who were orphaned as result of the war state. She advocates non-violence. When Sis tries to stop Elamba from taking Lala-Ru hostage, she is shot in the leg and dies in the final episode from the bleeding. 
  is the leader of the radical faction at Zari-Bars. His entire family was murdered by Hellywood's soldiers. Periodically, he sends assassins into Hellywood to try to kill King Hamdo. Ironically, Elamba's ruthless methods resemble those of the man he hates. He seizes Lala-Ru and tries unsuccessfully to use her to negotiate with Hellywood. This ends with him being sprayed by bullets and falling to his death. 
  is a quiet young girl living with Sis and the orphans in Zari-Bars. She spends many days separated from the other children her age in hopes that her father may one day return. Little does she know that her father was one of Elamba's assassins that died at the hands of Nabuca and the other Hellywood soldiers. In the meanwhile, she begins to open up to both Shu and Lala-Ru, requesting that they stay even when the radicals of the village turn against them. When she overhears Nabuca admit to killing the assassins, Soon attempts to kill Nabuca with a rifle but fails to do so due to Boo's self-sacrifice. Nabuca, horrified and almost reflexively shoots her to death in return.

Media

Anime episode list

Soundtrack
Released 1999, the Now and Then, Here and There contains seventeen tracks, including the opening and ending sequences. Most of the tracks are performed by Taku Iwasaki (credited as Takumi Iwasaki) with one track performed by Toshio Masuda and one performed by Masuda and Reiko Yasuhara.

Reception
The show was very well received by critics and also received comparisons to Grave of the Fireflies. AnimeOnDVD.com stated Now and Then, Here and There is "a wonderfully scripted show, where each line of dialog seems to be said with some larger purpose behind it." Of the events of war, the show continues a "devastating and brutal feel throughout.". Commenting on the realism of the show, reviewer Chris Beveridge stated "The story doesn’t flinch from putting people into the situations and resolving them in a way that they’d likely play out in real life." SciFi.com stated the show was "a cruel series with a kindhearted message" that contrasted brutality with a greater message. The review further mentioned:

Never before in anime have I seen a dead cat used as a motif and a metaphor. But like so many aspects of Now and Then, Here and There, this unusual artistic decision is a startling, effective and chilling one.

J!-ENT.com's Dennis A. Amith stated that the series "shows a perspective of war through the eyes of a young teen. The savagery, the brutality, and how even through darkness, how hope can go a long way. A riveting anime series that is worth watching and even worth owning!" Anime News Network reviewer Theron Martin called the series "one of the best-written and most emotionally powerful anime series ever made."

See also

 Military use of children
 Dying Earth genre

References

External links
 Official Geneon Entertainment Now and Then, Here and There website 
 

1999 anime television series debuts
ADV Films
Anime International Company
Anime with original screenplays
Central Park Media
Fictional child soldiers
Hideyuki Kurata
NBCUniversal Entertainment Japan
Existentialist anime and manga
Post-apocalyptic anime and manga
Works about children in war
Works about child soldiers
Works about slavery
Wowow original programming
Refugees and displaced people in fiction